Faithfully flat descent is a technique from algebraic geometry, allowing one to draw conclusions about objects on the target of a faithfully flat morphism. Such morphisms, that are flat and surjective, are common, one example coming from an open cover.

In practice, from an affine point of view, this technique allows one to prove some statement about a ring or scheme after faithfully flat base change.

"Vanilla" faithfully flat descent is generally false; instead, faithfully flat descent is valid under some finiteness conditions (e.g., quasi-compact or locally of finite presentation).

A faithfully flat descent is a special case of Beck's monadicity theorem.

Idea 
Given a faithfully flat ring homomorphism , the faithfully flat descent is, roughy, the statement that to give a module or an algebra over A is to give a module or an algebra over  together with the so-called descent datum (or data).

Affine case 

Let  be a faithfully flat ring homomorphism. Given an -module , we get the -module  and because  is faithfully flat, we have the inclusion . Moreover, we have the isomorphism  of -modules that is induced by the isomorphism  and that satisfies the cocycle condition:

where  are given as:

Now, the most basic form of faithfully flat descent says that the above construction can be reversed; i.e., given a -module  and a -module isomorphism  such that , an invariant submodule:

is such that .

Here is the precise definition of descent datum. Given a ring homomorphism , we write:

Now, given a -module  with a descent datum , define  to be the kernel of
.
Consider the natural map
.
The key point is that this map is an isomorphism if  is faithfully flat. This is seen by considering the following:

where the top row is exact by the flatness of B over A and the bottom row is the Amitsur complex, which is exact by a theorem of Grothendieck. The cocycle condition ensures that the above diagram is commutative. Since the second and the third vertical maps are isomorphisms, so is the first one.

The forgoing can be summarized simply as follows:

Zariski descent 
The Zariski descent refers simply to the fact that a quasi-coherent sheaf can be obtained by gluing those on a (Zariski-)open cover. It is a special case of a faithfully flat descent but is frequently used to reduce the descent problem to the affine case.

In a fancy language, the Zariski descent states that, with respect to the Zariski topology,  is a stack; i.e., a category  equipped with the functor  the category of (relative) schemes that has an effective descent theory. Here, let  denote the category consisting of pairs  consisting of a (Zariski)-open subset U and a quasi-coherent sheaf on it and  the forgetful functor .

Descent for quasi-coherent sheaves 
There is a succinct statement for the major result in this area: (the prestack of quasi-coherent sheaves over a scheme S means that, for any S-scheme X, each X-point of the prestack is a quasi-coherent sheaf on X.)

The proof uses Zariski descent and the faithfully flat descent in the affine case.

Here "quasi-compact" cannot be eliminated.{

Example: a vector space 
Let F be a finite Galois field extension of a field k. Then, for each vector space V over F,

Specific descents

fpqc descent

Étale descent 
An étale descent is a consequence of a faithfully descent.

Galois descent

See also 
Amitsur complex
Hilbert scheme
Quot scheme

Notes

References 
 
 
 
  (a detailed discussion of a 2-category)
 
 

Algebraic geometry